The Four Vagabonds was an American male vocal group. Active for twenty years (1933–1953), they form a bridge between vocal quartet jive of the 1930s and the rhythm and blues vocal groups that thrived after World War II.

The Vagabonds
 
The Four Vagabonds were formed in 1933 by four African American students at Vashon High School in St. Louis: John Jordan (lead singer), Norval Taborn (baritone), Robert O'Neal (tenor), and Ray Grant (bass; Grant also played guitar accompaniment). Their early work showed strong Mills Brothers influence.

They first appeared on college radio, then on WIL, and then on NBC Radio on KSD. This led to a 1936 move to Chicago radio, including Don McNeill's Breakfast Club and Garry Moore's Club Matinee. Throughout the 1940s the Four Vagabonds made network radio appearances on many national shows, including the Chesterfield Supper Club, the Nat King Cole Show, and others.

On April 1, 1949, during the pioneering early days of television, the local variety show Happy Pappy premiered on the local Chicago station WENR-TV. Hosted by Ray Grant and featuring the Four Vagabonds (as well as the Modern Modes and other groups), it was the first all-African-American television show, although short-lived.

The group continued into the 1950s, with successive replacements (Bill Sanford, Frank Houston) for Ray Grant, who had vision problems. Their last release was a re-issue "P.S. I Love You", in 1953.

In the 1980s original member John Jordan put together a new Four Vagabonds group. In 1997 Billy Shelton, who was a member of the 1980s incarnation, started another Four Vagabonds.

Deaths 
Ray Grant died on December 13, 1950. He was 34.

Robert O'Neal died on December 15, 1968. He was 52.

John Jordan died on June 16, 1988. He was 74.

Norval Taborn died on January 23, 1990. He was 74.

Discography

References

External links

Musical groups established in 1933
Musical groups from St. Louis
Traditional pop music singers
Vocal quartets
African-American musical groups